Selborne Priory was a priory of Augustinian canons in Selborne, Hampshire, England.

Foundation
The priory was founded in 1233 by Peter des Roches, Bishop of Winchester. The bishop initially endowed the priory with lands obtained by gift from James de Acangre, James de Norton, and King Henry III. The canons had the manor of Selborne with all its privileges and the churches of Selborne, Basing and Basingstoke. The foundation was confirmed by Pope Gregory IX in September, 1235

13th to 15th centuries
The house acquired numerous small endowments over the years, but also various obligations such as the upkeep of the vicarages of the various churches. The original foundation was for fourteen canons but by the mid fifteenth century this number had fallen to just four and the priory was in serious debt.

Dissolution
On 21 April 1478 the general chapter of the Augustinian Order authorised a visitation by the priors of Breamore and Tortington. And on 2 September 1484 Bishop Waynflete appointed a commission for the annexing of the priory to Magdalen College, Oxford. The evidence given to the commission showed that there were no canons in residence and the buildings were dilapidated. The decree of annexation was pronounced on 11 September 1484 and confirmed in 1485.

Post-Dissolution
After the suppression a chantry priest was maintained by the college at Selborne, to celebrate masses for the benefactors and founders of both college and priory. The muniments of the priory were transferred to the college and kept in the Founder's Tower.

Present day
No visible remains of the buildings can be seen above ground. Archaeological investigations were carried out in the 1960s and 1970s finding the remains of the church, cloister and other buildings. The surviving muniments are one of the most complete sets for any religious house in the country.

See also
List of monastic houses in Hampshire

References

A History of the County of Hampshire: Volume 2, The Victoria County History 1973
 The Buildings of England: Hampshire and the Isle of Wight, Nikolaus Pevsner and David Lloyd, 1967

Baker, David and contributors 2014. Selborne Priory: Excavations 1953-71. Hampshire Field club Monograph 12, 248pp
Abstract: The priory of Selborne in Hampshire was founded in 1233 for Augustinian canons by Peter des Roches, Bishop of Winchester, and dissolved in 1486 by his successor William Waynflete. A chantry chapel survived until about 1550. Excavations between 1953 and 1971, mostly by local volunteers, were stimulated by Gilbert White’s Natural History and Antiquities of Selborne (1789), but early work was confused by an assumption that the church lay north rather than south of the cloister. The cruciform church was largely completed by the mid-13th century: it had a long unaisled nave, transepts built with fully developed eastern chapels and an unextended presbytery. The west and north claustral ranges had undercrofts of seven bays with central free-standing piers. A two-bay chapter house was divided by an arcade; further north, the east range undercroft contained a square vaulted warming house or inner parlour. Graffiti on reused ashlar blocks in the drain for the canons’ latrine depicted a man, a horse and a crucifixion. Thirteen burials were found in four locations, six in stone coffins. Building materials include a fine foliate decorated roof boss from the presbytery, a quantity of mid-13th century grisaille glass, lead cames and window ties. A major collection of decorated medieval floor tiles is placed within Hampshire and wider contexts. Registered finds were mostly for domestic use rather than religious activity. 25 coins, tokens and jettons are reported. Eleven groups of ceramic wares include 15th and 16th century vessels for distillation and other alchemic practices already reported elsewhere. Documentary evidence is discussed including hitherto unpublished building repair accounts for the chantry in 1513–14. Reconstructions of the buildings are proposed in the wider context of Augustinian planning and by comparison with nearby contemporary Titchfield Abbey. Appendices note the excavation strategies, coffin lids at the parish church of St Mary, a 1490 inventory of church goods at the priory, and small scale excavations undertaken about 1900.

Augustinian monasteries in England
Priories in Hampshire
1485 disestablishments
1233 establishments in England
Christian monasteries established in the 13th century